Félicien Robert Challaye (1 November 1875 – 26 April 1967) was a French philosopher, anti-colonialist and human rights activist.

Early life
Félicien Challaye was born on 1 November 1875 in Lyon, France. He earned the agrégation in Philosophy in 1897.

Career
Challaye was a high school teacher of philosophy in Paris from 1903 to 1937. He served as Pierre Savorgnan de Brazza's secretary on his 1905 trip to the Congo. Three years later, in 1908, he founded a human rights organization for the indigenous people of the Congo. He subsequently served as the vice president of the Human Rights League.

Challaye served in World War I, and he was wounded in combat in 1915. After the war, he became a staunch pacifist. By 1931, he suggested he preferred peace to war, even if France had to be invaded by Germany.

Challaye was the author of many books on philosophy. He also published children's books under the pseudonym of Robert Fougère.

Death and legacy
Challaye died on 26 April 1967 in Paris, France. The rue Félicien Challaye in Tunis, Tunisia was named in his honor.

See also
 List of peace activists

Works

References

1875 births
1967 deaths
Writers from Lyon
Writers from Paris
French philosophers
Human Rights League (France) members
French people of World War I
French pacifists
Lycée Louis-le-Grand teachers